The Lerma chub (Algansea barbata) is a species of freshwater fish in the family Cyprinidae. It is endemic to the uppermost Lerma River basin in the State of Mexico and Toluca Valley of central Mexico.

References

Algansea
Freshwater fish of Mexico
Endemic fish of Mexico
Fish described in 1964
Lerma River